Calvin Stengs (born 18 December 1998) is a Dutch professional footballer who plays as a winger for Belgian club Antwerp, on loan from Ligue 1 club Nice, and the Netherlands national team.

A product of the AZ academy, Stengs broke into the first team during the 2017–18 season. He signed for Nice in France in 2021. At international level, Stengs represents the Netherlands, having made his debut for the senior team in November 2019.

Club career

AZ
Born in Nieuw-Vennep, North Holland, Stengs joined AZ's youth academy at the age of 12, having formerly played for local side SV DIOS and HFC Haarlem. He was promoted to the AZ reserves for the 2016–17 season playing in the third division. That season, he made 22 league appearances, scoring six goals and making eight assists. His strong performances for the reserves were noticed by first team head coach John van den Brom, and on 5 March 2017, Stengs made his professional debut for AZ in a 1–1 home draw against Excelsior in the Eredivisie.

Stengs was promoted to the AZ first team ahead of the 2017–18 season, and he made his first start for the club on 12 August in a 3–2 away loss against PSV Eindhoven. In the 7th minute of the match he twisted his knee and tore his ACL, cutting his first professional season short.

Stengs returned to first team action in November 2018 and reconquered his position in the AZ starting eleven, 15 months after his injury. On 16 January 2019, he scored his first goal for AZ in a 3–0 home win over FC Utrecht. Stengs ended the 2018–19 season with three goals and four assists in 21 appearances.

On 25 July 2019, Stengs made his debut in the Europa League in a 0–0 home draw against Swedish club BK Häcken. He made his first European goal in the return match in Sweden, netting in the 56th minute as AZ won 3–0 and advanced in the competition. He continued as a starter under head coaches Arne Slot and Pascal Jansen.

Nice
On 14 July 2021, Ligue 1 club Nice announced the signing of Stengs from AZ. He signed a five-year contract. On 28 August 2021, he made his debut for the club in a 4–0 league win over Bordeaux. He came on as a 36th-minute substitute for injured compatriot Justin Kluivert. On 25 September, he scored his first goal in a 3–0 win over bottom of the league Saint-Étienne.

Loan to Antwerp
On 30 August 2022, Stengs joined Antwerp in Belgium on a season-long loan. He made his debut on 4 September, starting in a 3–0 league victory over Westerlo. In his following appearance, a 2–1 home win against Seraing on 16 September, he recorded his first assist as his corner-kick was headed in by Toby Alderweireld.

International career
Born in the Netherlands, Stengs is of Surinamese descent. Stengs made his international debut for the Netherlands under-21 team on 24 March 2019 in a friendly against the United States. On 19 November 2019, Stengs made his debut for the Netherlands national team in the UEFA Euro 2020 qualifying match against Estonia, giving two assists in a 5–0 victory.

Career statistics

Club

Honours 
Nice

 Coupe de France runner-up: 2021–22

References

External links
 
 VI Profile

1998 births
Living people
Footballers from North Holland
Association football midfielders
Dutch footballers
Netherlands under-21 international footballers
Netherlands youth international footballers
Netherlands international footballers
Dutch sportspeople of Surinamese descent
Eredivisie players
Eerste Divisie players
Tweede Divisie players
Ligue 1 players
Belgian Pro League players
AZ Alkmaar players
Jong AZ players
OGC Nice players
Royal Antwerp F.C. players
Dutch expatriate footballers
Expatriate footballers in France
Dutch expatriate sportspeople in France
Expatriate footballers in Belgium
Dutch expatriate sportspeople in Belgium